Van Rooyen or Van Rooijen is an Afrikaans and  Dutch toponymic surname. "Rooij" or "Roij" was a local term for many towns ending with "rode" or "roij", like Nistelrode, Sint-Oedenrode, Stramproy and Wanroij. This suffix itself means "a clearing made by men".  Notable people with the surname include:

Ack van Rooyen (born 1930), Dutch jazz trumpeter, brother of Jerry
Aimee van Rooyen (born 1995), South African rhythmic gymnast
Basil van Rooyen (born 1939), South African racing driver
Cornelius van Rooyen (1860–1915), South African-born Rhodesian big game hunter and dog breeder
Van Rooyen's Lion Dog (a.k.a. Rhodesian Ridgeback), bred by him
David van Rooyen (born 1968), South African politician, Government Minister 2015–18
Diederik van Rooijen (born 1975), Dutch television and movie director
Erik van Rooyen (born 1990), South African golfer
Gert van Rooyen (1938–1990), South African serial killer
Jacques van Rooyen (born 1986), South African rugby player
Jerry van Rooyen, born "Gerard van Rooijen" (1928–2009), Dutch trumpeter, conductor, and composer
Laurens van Rooyen (born 1935), Dutch pianist and composer
Manon van Rooijen (born 1982), Dutch swimmer
Martin van Rooijen (born 1942), Dutch politician, State Secretary of Finances 1973–77
Maurits van Rooijen (born 1956), Dutch social and economic historian
Michael VanRooyen (born 1961), American humanitarian and physician
Mitchell van Rooijen (born 1998), Dutch football forward
Myriam van Rooyen-Steenman (born 1950), Dutch rower
Olivia van Rooijen (born 1988), Dutch rower
Reynier van Rooyen (born 1990), South African rugby player
Rocco van Rooyen (born 1992), South African javelin thrower
Rudi van Rooyen (born 1992), South African rugby player
Shaun van Rooyen (born 1987), New Zealand soccer player
Stephen Mark van Rooyen (born 1962), South African medical fraudster; a US most wanted fugitive
Tank van Rooyen (1892–1942), South African rugby player
 (born 1967), Dutch mountaineer who survived the 2008 K2 disaster

See also
Van Rooij and Van Royen, Dutch surnames of the same origin

References

Dutch-language surnames
Surnames of Dutch origin
Afrikaans-language surnames
Toponymic surnames

de:Rooyen